Buliminus labrosus, is a species of air-breathing land snail, a terrestrial pulmonate gastropod mollusk in the family Enidae.

Distribution 
This species occurs in:
 Israel

References

External links 

Enidae
Gastropods described in 1804